Centallo is a comune (municipality) in the Province of Cuneo in the Italian region Piedmont, located about  south of Turin and about  north of Cuneo.

The municipality of Centallo contains the frazioni (subdivisions, mainly villages and hamlets) San Biagio and Roata Chiusani.

Centallo borders the following municipalities: Castelletto Stura, Cuneo, Fossano, Montanera, Tarantasca, and Villafalletto.

References

Cities and towns in Piedmont